Attenborough railway station serves Attenborough in Nottinghamshire, England.

History
Built as a halt known as Attenborough Gate in 1856 on the Midland Counties Railway line from Nottingham to Derby which had opened in 1839, the station opened next to a level crossing and tickets were bought from the crossing keeper.

The station on the present site was built by the Midland Railway and opened on 1 September 1864; the Gate suffix was dropped and the name became Attenborough.

Becoming part of the London, Midland and Scottish Railway during the Grouping of 1923, the station then passed on to the London Midland Region of British Railways on nationalisation in 1948.

During World War I the station had its platforms extended as it was used as an interchange for soldiers and workers heading for National Shell Filling Factory No. 6 at Chilwell.

In April 1937 the station was renamed Chilwell. However, this did not go down well with Attenborough locals who raised a petition which 235 local people signed. This resulted in a decision by the LMS to revert the name to Attenborough.

The signal box survived until at least 1982 but is now demolished.

When Sectorisation was introduced in the 1980s, the station was served by Regional Railways until the Privatisation of British Railways.

It is an unstaffed station, having lost its station buildings and staff in the early 1990s. Following a rebuild of the platforms in 2005 the station has no architectural remains from any earlier station except parts of the footbridge.

The footbridge was replaced in 2007, receiving a new steel deck and stairways. The blue brick towers, which support the bridge, were retained.

Stationmasters

John Silvester until 1876
George Jukes 1876 - 1878
John Bradshaw Bott 1878 - 1904 (formerly station master at Carlton)
Arthur Griffin 1904 - 1908 (afterwards station master at Holwell Junction)
Joseph Henry Wildgoose 1908 - 1925 (formerly station master at Scotby)
Thomas R. Cliff 1931 - 1936
T. Powell from 1936 (formerly station master at Willington, Bedfordshire) - ca. 1948
Thomas W. Tate 1956 - 1966 (formerly station master at Nantwich)

Services
An hourly service is provided throughout the day by East Midlands Railway' Matlock to Nottingham service.  Most of these now run through to & from  since the December 2014 timetable change.  Additional services run at peak times, including some operated by CrossCountry.

On Sundays the service is also hourly, although only between Nottingham and Derby (two-hourly extensions to Matlock).

East Midlands Railway Mainline services from Leeds, Sheffield and London run through at high speed, but do not stop. Interchange with Mainline services can be made at Derby and Nottingham.

References

Higginson, M, (1989) The Midland Counties Railway: A Pictorial Survey, Derby: Midland Railway Trust.
 
 
 
 Station on navigable O.S. map

External links
Class 44 locomotive passing Attenborough Station 1976.
Train passing through Attenborough Station in 2005.
See Attenborough railway station on Google Street View.

Railway stations in Nottinghamshire
DfT Category F2 stations
Former Midland Railway stations
Railway stations in Great Britain opened in 1856
Railway stations in Great Britain closed in 1858
Railway stations in Great Britain opened in 1864
Railway stations served by East Midlands Railway
Railway stations served by CrossCountry
Transport in the Borough of Broxtowe